Bukit Chandan is a state constituency in Perak, Malaysia, that has been represented in the Perak State Legislative Assembly since 1974.

The state constituency was created in the 1974 redistribution and is mandated to return a single member to the Perak State Legislative Assembly under the first past the post voting system.

Demographics

History
2004–2016: The constituency contains the polling districts of Jalan Kangsar, Jalan Datoh, Jalan Dato Sagor, Kampong Talang, Kampong Pajak Potong, Kampong Sayong Lembah, Bukit Resident, Bukit Chandan, Bendang Kering, Menora, Senggang, Seberang Manong, Bekor.

2016–present: The constituency contains the polling districts of Jalan Kangsar, Jalan Datoh, Jalan Dato Sagor, Kampong Talang, Kampong Pajak Potong, Kampong Sayong Lembah, Bukit Resident, Bukit Chandan, Bendang Kering, Menora, Senggang, Seberang Manong, Bekor.

Polling districts
According to the federal gazette issued on 31 October 2022, the Bukit Chandan constituency is divided into 13 polling districts.

Representation history

Election results

References

Perak state constituencies